Kryptops is a genus of abelisaurid theropod dinosaur from the Early Cretaceous of Niger. It is known from a partial skeleton found at the Gadoufaoua locality in the western Ténéré Desert, in rocks of the Aptian-Albian age Elrhaz Formation. This dinosaur was described by paleontologists Paul Sereno and Stephen Brusatte in 2008. The genus name means "covered face", in reference to evidence that the face bore a tightly adhering covering. The type species is K. palaios, which means "old".

Discovery
 
 
 
According to the describers, this specimen represents one of the earliest known abelisaurids, and is notable for the heavily textured surface of the maxilla; the presence of pits and impressions of blood vessels indicates that there was a covering firmly attached to the face, perhaps of keratin. Sereno and Brusatte performed a cladistic analysis that found Kryptops to be the most basal abelisaurid. This was based on several features, including a maxilla textured externally by impressed vascular grooves and a narrow antorbital fossa, that clearly place Kryptops palaios within Abelisauridae as its oldest known member. In 2012 Matthew Carrano and colleagues, on the other hand, considered Kryptops palaios to be a chimera, and state that its postcranial remains (especially a pelvis and sacrum), found some 15 metres from the holotypic maxilla, actually belong to a carcharodontosaurid (possibly to Eocarcharia dinops).

See also 

 Timeline of ceratosaur research

References 

Abelisaurids
Early Cretaceous dinosaurs of Africa
Albian life
Aptian life
Cretaceous Niger
Fossils of Niger
Fossil taxa described in 2008
Taxa named by Paul Sereno
Taxa named by Stephen L. Brusatte